Charles Johnson (born January 5, 1983) is a former arena football player.

References

External links
Just Sports Stats

1983 births
Living people
Iowa Barnstormers players
Northern Iowa Panthers football players